White House is an unincorporated community in Page County, in the U.S. state of Virginia. The community earned its name from a mid-18th century fort-type house, often used for religious services in that time.

References

"White House Bridge" Marker at the Historical Markers Database
"White House" Marker at the Historical Markers Database

Unincorporated communities in Virginia
Unincorporated communities in Page County, Virginia